Pedro Fajardo y Chacón, 1st Marquis of los Vélez, Grandee of Spain, (in full), (unknown – 1542) was a Spanish military and nobleman. His seat was at the Castillo de Vélez-Blanco.

He was a son of don Juan Chacón and wife dona Luisa Fajardo y Manrique de Lara, 2nd Countess and Lady of Cartagena.

He was the 3rd Count and Lord of the City of Cartagena and the 7th Lord of Alhama, Mula, Lebrillo, Molina Seca, La Puebla, etc. He was Adelantado-Mayor and Captain-General of the Kingdom of Murcia, Commander of Caravaca and Thirteen (Trece) of the Order of Santiago, of the Council of the Catholic Monarchs Ferdinand V of Castile and Isabel I of Castile.

He was created 1st Marquess of los Vélez with a Coat of Arms of Fajardo on 12 September 1507 by Joanna of Castile and 1st Count of Gagliano. He was also made Grandee of Spain First Class recognized by Charles I of Spain in 1520.

He was humiliated when in 1520, the vocal citizens of Mula made him swear to respect the privileges that Ferdinand III of Castile gave to the village. In this way the dispute against the Marquess over the municipal government council began. The Marquess pre-empted the situation with the construction of his fortress to make his rule over the people of Mula assured.

He married firstly to dona Madalena Manrique de Lara y d'Acuña, daughter of the 2nd Counts of Paredes de Nava, and maternal granddaughter of the 1st Counts of Buendía, without issue. He married secondly to Dona Mencía de la Cueva, daughter of Don Francisco Fernández de la Cueva, 2nd Duke of Alburquerque and wife Dona Francisca Alvarez de Toledo and had an only son Luis Ybáñez Fajardo de la Cueva. He married thirdly in 1520 dona Catalina de Silva, daughter of the 3rd Counts of Cifuentes (don Juan de Silva and Dona Catalina de Toledo, sister of the 2nd Count of Oropesa), of which matrimony was born Don Juan Fajardo, who married dona Catalina de Ávalos or Dávalos, parents of Don Gonzalo Fajardo y Dávalos, Mayor of the Palace-Major (Majordomo-Mayor) of Philip IV of Spain, Alcalde-Mayor of Murcia and Cartagena, Knight of Calatrava, Artillery General and 1st  by mercy of January 8, 1649; this one married dona Isabel Manrique de Mendoza, 7th Countess of Castrojeriz and ?th Countess of Villazopeque, Grandee of Spain (widow of the 9th Count of Ribadavia), and had an heiress daughter Dona Juana Fajardo Manrique de Mendoza, without issue from both her marriages with the 9th Marquess of Astorga and the 4th Marquess (formerly Lords) of Cerralbo with a Coat of Arms of Pacheco (later Grandees of Spain on 28 August 1780) and 1st Count of Villalobos (for the first borns of the House), don Juan Antonio Pacheco y Osorio, Captain-General of Catalonia.

References

Sources

 [Link broken 25 July 2012]

1542 deaths
Marquesses of Los Vélez
Knights of Santiago
Pedro 01
Grandees of Spain
Year of birth unknown